Acacia ferocior is a shrub belonging to the genus Acacia and the subgenus Phyllodineae that is endemic to an area along the south coast of Western Australia.

The green, short, straight, erect, spinescent, green branches can be glabrous or slightly hairy. It produces yellow flowers from August to October.

It is native to an area along the south coast in the Goldfields-Esperance and Great Southern regions of Western Australia extending from Albany in the south west to Tambellup in the north west through to Ravensthorpe in the east where it grows in sandy-loam to clay soils as a part of mallee scrubland communities.

See also
List of Acacia species

References

ferocior
Acacias of Western Australia
Taxa named by Joseph Maiden
Plants described in 1920